Macedonia competed at the 2012 Winter Youth Olympics in Innsbruck, Austria. The Macedonian team was made up of two athletes in two sports.

Alpine skiing

Macedonia qualified one boy in alpine skiing.

Boy

Cross country skiing

Macedonia qualified one boy.

Boy
Sprint

See also
Macedonia at the 2012 Summer Olympics

References

Nations at the 2012 Winter Youth Olympics
North Macedonia at the Youth Olympics
2012 in Republic of Macedonia sport